Prunus subcordata, known by the common names Klamath plum, Oregon plum, Pacific plum and Sierra plum, is a member of the genus Prunus, native to the western United States, especially California and Oregon.

Description
It sprouts from its roots and can form dense, spiny thickets. The bark is gray with horizontal brown lenticels, similar in appearance to that of the cultivated cherry tree. The flowers are white or pinkish, 2 cm across, appearing in the spring in clusters of one to seven together. The fruit is a small, plum-like drupe, variable in appearance,  in length, and may be red or yellow; they mature in late summer. The plums are small and tart.

Varieties 
P. subcordata var. kelloggii is less hairy and had larger, yellow fruits. P. subcordata var. rubicunda is a shrub with red fruits, which are relatively bitter.

In addition to California and Oregon, P. subcordata var. subcordata, known as Klamath plum, is also found in Washington.

Similar species 
Prunus americana (American or wild plum) is found in the eastern United States.

Taxonomy
The three main common names are related to the plum's mountain ranges and locales.

Distribution and habitat
The species is native to Northern California and from central to western and southern Oregon. It grows in forests, most often at low elevations near the coast, but is also found in the Sierra Nevada and Cascades.

The range of P. subcordata surrounds the San Joaquin Valley, especially the western flank foothills of the Sierra Nevada range, but avoids the coast mountains of the southwest San Joaquin Valley. For other Pacific coastal Prunus species, P. emarginata is also found in the Pacific Northwest states; P. fremontii and P. ilicifolia are found in coastal or mountain areas of southwest California and northern Baja California.

Ecology
Various animals eat the fruit and thus spread the seeds.

Culture
The Concow tribe call the tree gos’-i (Konkow language).

See also
Klamath Mountains

References

External links

 
 United States Department of Agriculture Plants Profile for Prunus subcordata (Klamath plum)
 Lady Bird Johnson database, University of Texas, Klamath Plum
 CalPhotos photo gallery, University of California

subcordata
subcordata
Flora of the West Coast of the United States
Plants described in 1849
Natural history of the California Coast Ranges
Natural history of the Central Valley (California)
Natural history of the San Francisco Bay Area